This article is a catalog of actresses and models who have appeared on the cover of Harper's Bazaar Netherlands, the Dutch edition of Harper's Bazaar magazine, starting with the magazine's first issue in September 2014.

2014

2015

2016

2017

2018

2019

2020

External links
 Harper's Bazaar Netherlands
 Harper's Bazaar Netherlands on Models.com

Netherlands